The Thomas Jefferson Library is the main library for the University of Missouri–St. Louis, the largest public university in the St. Louis Metropolitan Area.

History

In 1963 the Normandy Residence Center, a two-year junior college, officially became the institution now known as the University of Missouri–St. Louis. The original University library was located in a small section of what had previously been the clubhouse of Bellerive Country Club. It contained a meager 3,800 volumes under the stewardship of a single professional librarian. By 2005 the Libraries of the university housed more than one million volumes, including a Federal Depository Library, a computerized Library Research Commons, and the St. Louis Mercantile Library at the University of Missouri–St. Louis.

The Thomas Jefferson Library was one of the first of three new buildings constructed on the campus. It opened in 1968 under the leadership of its first Library Director, Susan Freegard. Within its 5 stories, the Library was designed to house more than 240,000 volumes and allow seating for 1,000 students. The original "TJ Library" entrance also sported a swimming pool and basketball court which have since been removed.

By the 1980s the growing library collections began to displace staff and study areas. $6.1 million in funding was provided by the State of Missouri, McDonnell Douglas, Emerson Electric, and Anheuser-Busch, each being local St. Louis corporations. On June 13, 1990, the new McDonnell Douglas, Emerson Electric, Anheuser-Busch Wing of the Thomas Jefferson Library was dedicated. Of architectural interest is the glass pyramid on the west side of the building. It is strikingly reminiscent of the version designed and built for the Louvre Museum in Paris, France by famed architect I.M. Pei.

In 1996 the 1,250 members of the Mercantile Library voted for and approved the Library's move from its downtown St. Louis location to the Thomas Jefferson Library building. On October 2, 1998, the St. Louis Mercantile Library at the University of Missouri–St. Louis was formally rededicated. The Mercantile Library now resides on the first two floors of the Thomas Jefferson Library building beneath its signature glass pyramid.

Resources and Holdings

Source: American Library Directory 2006-2007 

 1,051,952 Book Volumes
 1,011,867 Book Titles
 3,614 Periodical Subscriptions
 1,152 Videos
 109 Journals

Special Collections

 Colonial Latin American History
 Mercantile
 US Document Depository
 Utopian Literature and Science Fiction

References

External links

 

Library buildings completed in 1968
University and college academic libraries in the United States
Libraries in Missouri
Libraries in Greater St. Louis
University of Missouri–St. Louis
Buildings and structures in St. Louis County, Missouri
1968 establishments in Missouri